Erika Karp is an American entrepreneur, businesswoman and investment advisor as well as a writer and speaker on issues related to sustainable finance. She is the Founder and chief executive officer of Cornerstone Capital Inc., an investment firm. Acknowledged as a veteran executive on Wall Street, Karp is an advocate for greater corporate transparency, inclusion of environmental, social and governance (ESG) data in investment analysis, and the creation of a more sustainable form of capitalism through disciplined investment practices.

Karp is a founding Board member of the Sustainability Accounting Standards Board, a U.S. non-profit organization incorporated in 2011 to develop and disseminate industry-specific social and environmental financial-reporting standards. She is an advisor to the UN Global Compact's LEAD Board Development Program, a member of the World Economic Forum’s Global Agenda Council on Financing and Capital, and an Advisor to the Clinton Global Initiative’s Market-based Approaches track.

Prior to launching Cornerstone in August 2013, Karp was managing director and head of Global Sector Research at UBS Investment Bank. She also chaired the UBS Global Investment Review Committee and served on the UBS Securities Research Executive Committee and the Environmental and Human Rights Committee of the UBS Group Executive Board.

Education and early career 
Karp received her B.S. in economics from the University of Pennsylvania’s Wharton School in 1985  and her MBA in finance from Columbia Business School in 1991.

She began her professional career at IBM’s ROLM Telecom division as an account representative. In 1989, she left IBM to get her MBA. In 1991, Karp became a director of institutional equity sales at Credit Suisse First Boston.

Karp joined UBS Investment Bank in 1999 and was promoted to managing director, global head of Research Product Management in 2002. She created the UBS Q-Series research initiative to drive investment research from across regions. She also joined the Global Investment Review Committee (GIRC), composed of researchers from around the world. In 2007, Karp was appointed head of Global Sector Research.

Awards and honors
Karp has been named to AdvisorOne’s “Top 50 Women in Wealth,”  GOOD magazine's “GOOD 100”  and the “Purpose Economy 100.”  She is also among 50 “conscious capitalists” profiled in Kim Curtin's 2015 book, “Transforming Wall Street: A Conscious Path for a New Future.”  

In 2014, she was named as a “Woman of Influence” by the New York City Business Journal, as part of a national program honoring women who innovate, succeed and "pay it forward," and who stand out both for their achievements in the marketplace as well as their commitment to community and mentoring. 

She was honored in May 2015 by the Greyston Foundation of Yonkers New York, for demonstrating a lifelong commitment in support of sustainable business and social enterprise.

Cornerstone Capital was a finalist for the 2014 Finance for the Future Award, which recognizes financial leadership in developing successful business models that produce financial returns and deliver environmental and social benefits.

References

American investment bankers
Living people
Wharton School of the University of Pennsylvania alumni
Columbia Business School alumni
American women chief executives
American chief executives of financial services companies
Year of birth missing (living people)
21st-century American women